Chispita (English: Little Spark) is an album from the soap opera Chispita starring Lucerito. The album was inspired by the huge success of the eponymous soap opera. The album has two versions: a Spanish-language version by Timbiriche, and a Portuguese-language version featuring various artists made by the Brazilian channel SBT, that broadcast the telenovela in Brazil.

The first Spanish edition of the album was released in 1983, and the second one was released in 1984. Also there are two editions of the Portuguese version of the album. The first one was released in 1983, in its first exhibition and the second one was released in 1992, during the seventh exhibition of the telenovela on the channel SBT. The album was a success in Brazil. The song "Chispita" by Timbiriche reached #2 on the Mexican charts.

Spanish track list
 "Chispita" featured on the album La Banda Timbiriche

Brazilian track list
 Anjo Bom - Sarah Regina e a Turminha Levada da Breca
 Festa dos Insetos - Gilliard
 Docinho, Docinho - Gugu
 Vamos a la Playa - Novo Nuevo
 Garota Sapeca - Carlinhos Borba Gato
 Comer, Comer - Brazilian Genghis Khan
 Music Box Dancer - Bruno Carezza
 Baile dos Passarinhos - Gugu
 Amigo É - Harmony Cats
 O Rei da Festa - Carlinhos Borba Gato
 A Família - Sarah Regina e a Turminha Levada da Breca
 40 Grados (Que calor de loco!) - Los Maneros
 Chispita - Algazarra

References

1983 albums
1984 albums
Timbiriche songs